This list contains all types of structures  in height or more, which is the accepted criterion for a building to qualify as a skyscraper in the United Kingdom.

Entries in italics denote approximate figures.

Structures taller than 300 metres

Structures 250 to 300 metres tall

Structures 200 to 250 metres tall

Structures 150 to 200 metres tall

Other notable tall structures 

A separate list also exists for the tallest of each architectural example or class.

 Salisbury Cathedral – tallest church spire in the United Kingdom
 Joseph Chamberlain Memorial Clock Tower, Birmingham – tallest free-standing clock tower in the world
 Monument to the Great Fire of London, London – tallest isolated stone column in the world
 ArcelorMittal Orbit, Olympic Park, London – tallest free standing public work of art in the UK

See also
List of tallest buildings in the United Kingdom
List of tallest buildings and structures in the United Kingdom by usage
List of tallest buildings by United Kingdom settlement
List of tallest buildings and structures in Birmingham
List of tallest buildings in Bristol
List of tallest buildings and structures in Edinburgh
List of tallest buildings and structures in Cardiff
List of tallest buildings and structures in Croydon
List of tallest buildings and structures in Glasgow
List of tallest buildings in Leeds
List of tallest buildings and structures in Liverpool
List of tallest buildings and structures in London
List of tallest buildings and structures in Manchester
List of tallest buildings and structures in Newcastle upon Tyne
List of tallest buildings and structures in Portsmouth
List of tallest buildings and structures in Salford
List of tallest buildings in Sheffield
List of tallest buildings and structures in Southampton
List of tallest buildings in Yorkshire
List of tallest structures in the world

References

External links
Air-traffic obstacle list of United Kingdom

 
United Kingdom